The 2022 La Flèche Wallonne was a road cycling one-day race that took place on 20 April 2022 from the Belgian city of Blegny to the municipality of Huy. It was the 86th edition of La Flèche Wallonne and the 16th event of the 2022 UCI World Tour. It was won for the first time by Dylan Teuns.

Teams
Twenty-five teams were invited to the race, including all eighteen UCI WorldTeams and seven UCI ProTeams. 

UCI WorldTeams

 
 
 
 
 
 
 
 
 
 
 
 
 
 
 
 
 
 

UCI ProTeams

Result

Notes 

As of 1 March 2022, the UCI announced that cyclists from Russia and Belarus would no longer compete under the name or flag of those respective countries due to the Russian invasion of Ukraine.

References

External links 

2022
La Flèche Wallonne
La Flèche Wallonne
La Flèche Wallonne